Hrefna is an Icelandic given name. It may refer to:

 Hrefna Björk Sverrisdóttir (born 1981), Icelandic businesswoman
 Hrefna Huld Jóhannesdóttir (born 1980), Icelandic footballer
 Hrefna Ingimarsdóttir (1931-2005), Icelandic athletics coach
 Hrefna Sigurjónsdóttir (born 1950), Icelandic academic
 Hrefna, fictionary character in Vikings: Valhalla, see Vikings: Valhalla#Recurring